The 1997 Major League Baseball season was the inaugural season for Interleague play, as well as the final season in the American League for the Milwaukee Brewers before moving to the NL the following season. The California Angels changed their name to the Anaheim Angels. The Florida Marlins ended the season (their fifth season in the majors) as the World Champions defeating the Cleveland Indians in a seven-game World Series, four games to three.

Standings

American League

National League

Postseason

Bracket

Awards and honors
Baseball Hall of Fame
Nellie Fox
Tommy Lasorda
Phil Niekro
Willie Wells

Other awards
Outstanding Designated Hitter Award: Edgar Martínez (SEA)
Roberto Clemente Award (Humanitarian):  Eric Davis (BAL).
Rolaids Relief Man Award: Randy Myers (BAL, American); Jeff Shaw (CIN, National).

Player of the Month

Pitcher of the Month

MLB statistical leaders

1 American League Triple Crown Pitching Winner

Managers

American League

National League

Home Field Attendance & Payroll

Events

January–March
January 5 – Boston Red Sox pitcher Tim Wakefield escapes serious injury when he is hit by a car while out jogging. He is released from the hospital after being treated for bruises.
January 6 – Knuckleballer Phil Niekro is elected to the Hall of Fame by the Baseball Writers' Association of America. Niekro receives 80.34% of the vote. Pitcher Don Sutton falls nine votes short of election.
February 20 – The Philadelphia Phillies sign free agent outfielder Danny Tartabull. Tartabull broke his foot on Opening Day and sat out the year before retiring.
March 5 – Nellie Fox, Tommy Lasorda and Negro leaguer Willie Wells are elected to the Hall of Fame by the Veterans Committee.

April–May
April 15 – In an unprecedented move, Commissioner of Baseball Bud Selig announces on the 50th Anniversary of Jackie Robinson's debut that the number he wore with the Brooklyn Dodgers, number 42, would be unilaterally retired throughout all of Major League Baseball during a mid-game ceremony in a game between the Dodgers and the New York Mets at Shea Stadium Rachael Robinson, Jackie's widow and President Bill Clinton attend the event as well. The number would be worn by players during the anniversary of his major league debut, and would still be worn by players who started wearing the number before the announcement, most famously the New York Yankees' Mariano Rivera, until he retired after the 2013 season, thus officially retiring number 42, as he was the last player to wear the number 42 jersey on a regular basis.
April 29 – Chili Davis' 300th home run, leading off the 10th inning, snaps a 5–5 tie and gives the Kansas City Royals a 6–5 win over the Toronto Blue Jays.
May 7 – The Montréal Expos score a National League-record 13 runs in the 6th inning of their game against the San Francisco Giants on the way to a 19–3 win. The Expos send 17 batters to the plate. Mike Lansing homers twice in the inning to drive in five runs, becoming the third Expos player to perform the feat, and the first NL second baseman to do so since Bobby Lowe in 1894.
May 8 – At home, the Baltimore Orioles stop Randy Johnson's 16-game win streak with a decisive 13–3 pasting of the Seattle Mariners. Baltimore is led by catcher Chris Hoiles, who collects six RBI on two homers and a double. Johnson strikes out 10 in six innings, but gives up five runs on six hits and two walks in his attempt to become the first AL pitcher since Dave McNally (1968–69) to win 17 straight.
May 13 – Eddie Murray gets two hits in Anaheim's 8–7 win over the Chicago White Sox. The game is the 3,000th of Murray's career, making him only the sixth player in history to reach that mark, joining Pete Rose, Carl Yastrzemski, Hank Aaron, Ty Cobb and Stan Musial.
May 21 – Roger Clemens fires the Toronto Blue Jays past the New York Yankees 4–1, for his 8th win of the year against no losses. The Rocket wins his 200th game, the 94th pitcher to reach the 200 victories mark.
May 25 – The Minnesota Twins retire Kirby Puckett's uniform number 34 in a 90-minute pregame ceremony.
May 26 – In the Chicago Cubs' 2–1 win over the Pittsburgh Pirates, Cub Sammy Sosa and Pirate Tony Womack both hit inside-the-park home runs in the sixth inning. It is the first time two inside-the-park homers are hit in the same NL game since Lou Brock and Héctor Cruz of the St. Louis Cardinals did it against the San Diego Padres on June 18, 1976. Greg Gagne of the Twins had two for Minnesota on October 4, 1986.
May 26 – In Toronto, Roger Clemens allows one run and four hits in seven innings and strikes out seven to beat the Rangers 8–1. The Rocket is now 9–0, his best start since beginning 1986 at 14–0.
May 26 – Andrés Galarraga hits a 469-foot two-run homer and Vinny Castilla adds a solo shot as the Colorado Rockies overcome a six-run deficit to beat the Cardinals 9–7. Galarraga has four RBI, and his moon shot off Mark Petkovsek is the third-longest homer in the three-season history of Coors Field.
May 27 – Barry Larkin's streak of consecutively reaching base 13 times is stopped by Curt Schilling, who goes all the way to beat Cincinnati 2–1. Larkin singles in the first inning, but flies out in the 3rd to end his streak one shy of Pedro Guerrero's NL record, set in 1985.
May 30 – The Orioles' Mike Mussina retires the first 25 Indian batters before Sandy Alomar Jr. ruins his no-hit bid with a one-out single in the 9th. Mussina then strikes out the final two batters for a 3–0 victory.
May 31 – Cal Ripken Jr. snaps a 7th-inning tie with a record-breaking home run as the Baltimore Orioles rally from a 4-run deficit to beat the Cleveland Indians 8–5. Ripken's homer gives him 4,274 total bases with Baltimore, breaking the franchise mark for total bases in a career. Baltimore also place Eric Davis on the disabled list. Davis is suffering from colon cancer and will be operated on in early June.
May 31 – In Miami, Andrés Galarraga golfs a 529-foot grand slam, the longest home run ever at Pro Player Stadium. His homer gives the Colorado Rockies a 7–0 lead over the Florida Marlins, and they eventually win 8–4. Galarraga has three home runs in the past three games against Florida that traveled 1,435 feet, an average of 478 feet. He hit a 455-foot homer two days before and a 451-foot homer the previous day. The longest previous homer at the stadium was 482 feet by Pete Incaviglia of the Phillies off Al Leiter on May 1, 1996.
May 31 – Unbeaten Roger Clemens is the first 10-game winner in the majors, as the Toronto Blue Jays romp 13–3 over the Oakland Athletics.
May 31 – Ila Borders of the St. Paul Saints of the Northern League faces three Sioux Falls Canaries batters, and surrenders three earned runs, in her professional baseball debut. The Canaries, who led 4–0 when she entered the game, go on to defeat St. Paul 11–1.

June–July
June 12 – The first interleague game took place as the Texas Rangers hosted the San Francisco Giants at The Ballpark in Arlington (now Globe Life Park).
July 8 – The American League defeats the National League by a score of 3–1 in the annual All-Star Game, played at Jacobs Field. Cleveland Indians catcher Sandy Alomar Jr. hits a 2-run home run and is named the game's MVP. Alomar is the first hometown player to homer since Hank Aaron did it in Atlanta–Fulton County Stadium in 1972.
July 12 – At a sold out Three Rivers Stadium, Francisco Córdova pitched nine innings of a combined 10-inning no-hitter for the Pittsburgh Pirates. Ricardo Rincón pitched the 10th inning. The Pirates won the game on a dramatic three run, pinch hit home run in the bottom of the 10th by Mark Smith.

August–September
August 31 – Don Mattingly the former first baseman and Yankee captain has his uniform number 23 retired by the New York Yankees in a pregame ceremony. A plaque is also dedicated in his honor in Monument Park.
September 4 – Rookie catcher Bobby Estalella has three home runs and four RBI as he leads the Philadelphia Phillies to a 6–4 win over the Montréal Expos.
September 10 – Mark McGwire joins Babe Ruth as the only players in major league history with 50 home runs in consecutive seasons by hitting a 446-foot shot off Shawn Estes in the third inning of the St. Louis Cardinals' road game against the San Francisco Giants. McGwire, who hit a major league-leading 52 homers for the Oakland Athletics last season, becomes the first player with back-to-back 50-homer seasons since Ruth did it in 1927 and 1928.
September 28 – Tony Gwynn of the San Diego Padres ties Honus Wagner's record by winning his eighth National League batting title. Gwynn finishes at .372, becoming the first player to win four consecutive NL batting titles since Rogers Hornsby won six straight between 1920 and 1925.

October–December
October 26 – The Florida Marlins beat the Cleveland Indians in Game 7 to become the first Wild Card team to win the World Series.
October 27 – The Detroit Tigers break ground on their new ballpark.
November 4 - Voters in 11 counties in southwestern Pennsylvania reject the Regional Renaissance Initiative, a voter referendum to raise sales taxes to fund new stadiums for the Pittsburgh Pirates and Pittsburgh Steelers.  The public funding necessary to ensure their construction would eventually be approved legislatively in an alternate proposal colloquially known as "Plan B".
November 6 – The Milwaukee Brewers switch leagues, joining the National League Central Division, after the Kansas City Royals reject the invitation. With the 1998 addition of the Arizona Diamondbacks (NL) and Tampa Bay Devil Rays (AL), the move will maintain an even number of teams in each league.
November 18 — The expansion draft starts with several transactions. Two pitchers who appeared in the World Series a month earlier, Tony Saunders (Florida Marlins) and Brian Anderson (Cleveland Indians), are the first players taken. Saunders, the first player chosen overall, heads a list of new Tampa Bay Devil Rays team that includes Quinton McCracken, Bubba Trammell, Albie López and Terrell Wade. Tampa Bay also obtain John Flaherty from the San Diego Padres in exchange for Brian Boehringer and Andy Sheets; Kevin Stocker from the Philadelphia Phillies for Bobby Abreu; Fred McGriff from the Atlanta Braves in exchange for a player to be named, and sign free agent Roberto Hernández. The Arizona Diamondbacks, meanwhile, who signed free agent Jay Bell to a five-year contract yesterday, select Jeff Suppan, Jorge Fábregas and Karim García, and acquire Travis Fryman from the Detroit Tigers in exchange for Joe Randa, Gabe Alvarez and a minor leaguer. They also obtain Devon White from the Florida Marlins for a prospect.

Deaths
January 6 – Dick Donovan, 69, All-Star pitcher, mainly with the White Sox and Indians, who led AL in ERA in 1961 and won 20 games in 1962
January 20 – Curt Flood, 59, All-Star center fielder who won seven Gold Gloves and batted .300 six times; challenged baseball's reserve clause all the way to the U.S. Supreme Court, unsuccessfully, after refusing a trade
February 7 – Manny Salvo, 83, Boston pitcher who tied for the National League lead in shutouts in 1940
February 13 – Bobby Adams, 75, third baseman for the Cincinnati Reds/Redlegs, Chicago White Sox, Baltimore Orioles and Chicago Cubs between 1946 and 1959
June 1 – Mickey Rocco, 81, Cleveland first baseman who led the American League in fielding percentage at his position in 1943 and 1945
June 9 – Thornton Lee, 90, All-Star pitcher who won over 100 games for the White Sox; won 22 games and led AL in ERA in 1941
July 31 – Eddie Miller, 80, 7-time All-Star shortstop for four NL teams who led league in fielding five times
August 23 – Guy Curtright, 84, White Sox outfielder who finished sixth in 1943 American League batting race with a .291 average
September 9 – Richie Ashburn, 70, Hall of Fame center fielder for the Phillies who batted .308 lifetime, winning two batting titles, and led NL in putouts nine times, hits three times, triples twice and steals once; retired with six of the top eight single-season putout totals in history
September 22 – Eddie Sawyer, 87, manager who led the Phillies' "Whiz Kids" to the 1950 pennant, later a scout
September 26 – Woody English, 91, All-Star infielder for the Cubs who batted .300 twice
October 6 – Johnny Vander Meer, 82, All-Star pitcher for the Cincinnati Reds who in 1938 became the only player to pitch two consecutive no-hitters; led NL in strikeouts three times
October 21 – Dolph Camilli, 90, All-Star first baseman who was the NL's MVP in 1941, leading the Brooklyn Dodgers to the pennant; had five 100-RBI seasons
November 2 – Roy McMillan, 68, All-Star shortstop for the Reds, Braves and Mets who won the NL's first three Gold Gloves; minor league manager, coach and scout
November 20 – Dick Littlefield, 71, well-traveled pitcher who played for nine teams, earning 15 of his 33 wins with the Pirates
November 27 – Buck Leonard, 90, Hall of Fame first baseman of the Negro leagues regularly among the league leaders in batting average and home runs

References

External links
1997 Major League Baseball season schedule at Baseball Reference

 
Major League Baseball seasons